Edmund Wallis Strange (March 1871 – 1925) was an English footballer who played in the Football League for Aston Villa.

References

1871 births
1925 deaths
English footballers
Association football midfielders
English Football League players
Birmingham City F.C. players
Aston Villa F.C. players